Niedringhaus is a surname. Notable people with the surname include:

 Anja Niedringhaus (1965–2014), German photojournalist
 Frederick G. Niedringhaus (1837–1922), American businessman and politician
 Henry F. Niedringhaus (1864–1941), American politician